Inquisitor rufovaricosus is a species of sea snail, a marine gastropod mollusk in the family Pseudomelatomidae, the turrids.

Description
Inquisitor rufovaricosus has a shell size of 25–65 mm.

Distribution
Inquisitor rufovaricosus is native to Malaysia, the Philippines, and Japan.

References

 Kuroda, T.; Habe, T.; Oyama, K. (1971). The sea shells of Sagami Bay. Maruzen Co., Tokyo. xix, 1-741 (Japanese text), 1-489 (English text), 1-51 (Index), pls 1-121
 Stahlschmidt P. & Fraussen K. (2017). Description of Inquisitor ritae new species from the Philippines (Conoidea: Pseudomelatomidae). Miscellanea Malacologica. 7(2): 29–32.

External links
 
 

rufovaricosus
Gastropods described in 1971